Ten Peachtree Place is a high-rise class A office building in midtown Atlanta, Georgia. The building was designed by Michael Graves and completed in 1989. It currently serves as the headquarters for Southern Company Gas. The building is notable for its 30-foot-high arch and red granite exterior that contrasts with the building's dark windows.

History 
The building, designed by American architect Michael Graves, opened in 1989. It was originally intended to be a part of LJ Hooker's Gateway Atlanta project before that company declared bankruptcy shortly after the building's opening. One of the first major tenants in the building was the Coca-Cola Company, leading to the building sometimes being referred to as the Coca-Cola Computer Center. In 2002, the building underwent a $30 million renovation focusing primarily on the building's interior. In 2012, Prudential Real Estate Investors (the real estate division of Prudential Financial) purchased the building from a partnership between Cousins Properties and the Coca-Cola Company for $61 million, retaining Cousins Properties to manage the property. In 2014, AGL Resources (now Southern Company Gas), took full occupancy of the building, which serves as its corporate headquarters.

References

External links 
 

Buildings and structures in Atlanta
Buildings and structures completed in 1989
Postmodern architecture in the United States
Southern Company
Michael Graves buildings
New Classical architecture